Séguéla Department is a department of Worodougou Region in Woroba District, Ivory Coast. In 2021, its population was 298,384 and its seat is the settlement of Séguéla. The sub-prefectures of the department are Bobi-Diarabana, Dualla, Kamalo, Massala, Séguéla, Sifié, and Worofla.

History

Séguéla Department was created in 1969 as one of the 24 new departments that were created to take the place of the six departments that were being abolished. It was created from territory that was formerly part of Nord Department. Using current boundaries as a reference, from 1969 to 1980 the department occupied the territory that is Worodougou Region and Béré Region.

In 1980, Séguéla Department was divided to create Mankono Department. In 1997, regions were introduced as new first-level subdivisions of Ivory Coast; as a result, all departments were converted into second-level subdivisions. Séguéla Department was included as part of Worodougou Region.

In 2009, what was left of Séguéla Department was divided again to create Kani Department.

In 2011, districts were introduced as new first-level subdivisions of Ivory Coast. At the same time, regions were reorganised and became second-level subdivisions and all departments were converted into third-level subdivisions. At this time, Séguéla Department remained part of the retained Worodougou Region in Woroba District.

Notes

Departments of Worodougou
1969 establishments in Ivory Coast
States and territories established in 1969